Karanga is the smallest of the six traditional districts of the island of Mangaia in the Cook Islands. It is located in the northeast of the island, to the east of the District of Tava'enga and northwest of the District of Ivirua. The district was traditionally divided into 5 tapere:
 Kaau-i-uta
 Kaau-i-miri
 Teia-pini
 Teia-poto
 Teia-roa

Mangaia Airport is located in this district.

References

Districts of the Cook Islands
Mangaia